The Nationalist government, officially the National Government of the Republic of China, also known as the Second Republic of China or simply as the Republic of China, refers to the government of the Republic of China from 1 July 1925 to 20 May 1948, led by the Kuomintang (Chinese Nationalist Party).

After the outbreak of the Xinhai Revolution on 10 October 1911, revolutionary leader Sun Yat-sen was elected Provisional President and founded the Provisional Government of the Republic of China. To preserve national unity, Sun ceded the presidency to military strongman Yuan Shikai, who established the Beiyang government. After a failed attempt to install himself as Emperor of China, Yuan died in 1916, leaving a power vacuum which resulted in China being divided into several warlord fiefdoms and rival governments. They were nominally reunified in 1928 by the Nanjing-based government led by Generalissimo Chiang Kai-shek, which after the Northern Expedition governed the country as a one-party state under the Kuomintang, and was subsequently given international recognition as the legitimate representative of China. The Nationalist government would then experience many challenges such as the Second Sino-Japanese War, the Chinese Civil War and World War II. The government was in place until it was replaced by the current Government of the Republic of China in the newly promulgated Constitution of the Republic of China of 1948.

History 

The oldest surviving republic in East Asia, the Republic of China was formally established on 1January 1912 in mainland China following the Xinhai Revolution, which itself began with the Wuchang Uprising on 10October 1911, replacing the Qing dynasty and ending nearly three thousand years of imperial rule in China. Central authority waxed and waned in response to warlordism (1915–28), Japanese invasion (1937–45), and the Chinese Civil War (1927–49), with central authority strongest during the Nanjing Decade (1927–37), when most of China came under the control of the Kuomintang (KMT) under an authoritarian one-party state.

At the end of World War II in 1945, the Empire of Japan surrendered control of Taiwan and its island groups to the Allies, and Taiwan was placed under the Republic of China's administrative control. The legitimacy of this transfer is disputed and is another aspect of the disputed political status of Taiwan.

After World War II, the civil war between the ruling Kuomintang and the Chinese Communist Party (CCP) resumed, despite attempts at mediation by the United States. The Nationalist Government began drafting the Constitution of the Republic of China under a National Assembly, but was boycotted by the CCP. With the promulgation of the constitution, the Nationalist Government abolished itself and was replaced by the Government of the Republic of China. Following their loss of the Civil War, the Nationalist Government retreated and moved their capital to Taipei while claiming that they were the legitimate government of the mainland.

Founding 

After Sun's death on 12 March 1925, four months later on 1 July 1925, the National Government of the Republic of China was established in Guangzhou.

The following year, as Generalissimo of the National Revolutionary Army, Chiang Kai-shek became the de facto leader of the Kuomintang (KMT), or Chinese Nationalist Party. He especially headed the right-wing of the Nationalist Party, while the Communists formed part of the Party's left-wing. Chiang led the Northern Expedition through China with the intention of defeating the warlords and unifying the country. The National Revolutionary Army received significant aid from the Soviet Union; Chiang himself was surrounded by Soviet military advisors. Much of the Nationalist Party, however, became convinced, not without reason, that the Communists, under recent orders from the Comintern, wanted to break from the United Front and get rid of the KMT.

Chiang decided to strike first and purged the Communists, killing thousands of them. At the same time, other violent conflicts took place in the south of China where peasant associations supported by the CCP were attacking landlords and local gentry, who formed a base of political support for the KMT right-wing and recruitment for Nationalist soldiers. These events eventually led to the Chinese Civil War between the Nationalist Party and the CCP. Chiang Kai-shek pushed the CCP into the interior as he sought to destroy them, and moved the Nationalist Government to Nanjing in 1927. Leftists within the KMT still allied to the CCP, led by Wang Jingwei, had established a rival Nationalist Government in Wuhan two months earlier, but soon joined Chiang in Nanjing in August 1927. By the following year, Chiang's army had captured Beijing after overthrowing the Beiyang government and unified the entire nation, at least nominally, marking the beginning the Nanjing Decade.

Nanjing Decade and War with Japan

According to Sun Yat-sen's "Three Stages of Revolution" theory, the KMT was to rebuild China in three phases: the first stage was military unification, which was carried out with the Northern Expedition; the second was "political tutelage" which was a provisional government led by the KMT to educate people about their political and civil rights, and the third stage would be constitutional government. By 1928, the Nationalists claimed that they had succeeded in reunifying China and were beginning the second stage, the period of so-called "tutelage". In 1931, they promulgated a provisional constitution that established the one-party rule of the KMT and promised eventual democratization. In practice, this meant that Chiang Kai-Shek was able to continue authoritarian rule.

Even had it been the KMT's intention, historians such as Edmund Fung argue that they may not have been able to establish a democracy under the circumstances of the time. Despite nominal reunification, the Chiang's Nationalist Government relied heavily on the support of warlords such as Ma Hushan, Yan Xishan, and Chang Hsueh-liang to exert control on the provinces. The loyalty of these figures was often highly suspect, and they frequently engaged in acts of open defiance or even rebellion. In alliance with local landlords and other power-brokers, they blocked moderate land reforms that might have benefits the rural poor. Instead, the poor peasants remained a consistent source of recruits for the Communist Party. While weakened by frequent massacres and purges—historian Rudolph Rummel estimated that 1,654,000 people were killed by the KMT in anti-Communist purges during this period—the Communists were able to survive and posed a major latent threat to the regime. However, perhaps the biggest challenges came from within the administration itself. As Chiang Kai-Shek told the state council: "Our organization becomes worse and worse ... many staff members just sit at their desks and gaze into space, others read newspapers and still others sleep." Corruption was endemic at all levels of government. The tension between Chiang's centralizing tendencies and the warlords who supported him led to friction and inconsistent direction. Even the KMT itself was disunified, with the pro-Chiang factions of the CC Clique, Political Study Clique, and fascist-inspired Blue Shirts Society opposed by a left-wing faction under Wang Jingwei and a right-wing faction influenced by Hu Hanmin. To control the opposing KMT factions, Chiang relied increasingly on the National Revolutionary Army.

Economic growth and social improvements were mixed. The Kuomintang supported women's rights and education, the abolition of polygamy, and foot binding. The government of the Republic of China under Chiang's leadership also enacted a women's quota in the parliament with reserved seats for women.  During the Nanjing Decade, average Chinese citizens received the education they'd never had the chance to get in the dynasties that increased the literacy rate across China. The education also promotes the ideals of Tridemism of democracy, republicanism, science, constitutionalism, and Chinese Nationalism based on the Political Tutelage of the Kuomintang. However, Periodic famines continued under Nationalist rule: in Northern China from 1928 to 1930, in Sichuan from 1936 to 1937, and in Henan from 1942 to 1943. In total, these famines cost at least 11.7 million lives. GDP growth averaged 3.9 per cent a year from 1929 to 1941 and per capita GDP about 1.8 per cent. Among other institutions, the Nationalist Government founded the Academia Sinica and the Central Bank of China. In 1932, China sent a team for the first time to the Olympic Games.

The Nationalists faced a new challenge with the Japanese invasion of Manchuria in 1931, with hostilities continuing through the Second Sino-Japanese War, part of World War II, from 1937 to 1945. The government of the Republic of China retreated from Nanjing to Chongqing. In 1945, after the war of eight years, Japan surrendered and the Republic of China, under the name "China", became one of the founding members of the United Nations. The government returned to Nanjing in 1946.

Post-World War II 

After the defeat of Japan during World War II, Taiwan was surrendered to the Allies, with ROC troops accepting the surrender of the Japanese garrison. The government of the ROC proclaimed the "retrocession" of Taiwan to the Republic of China and established a provincial government on the island. The military administration of the ROC extended over Taiwan, which led to widespread unrest and increasing tensions between local Taiwanese and mainlanders. The shooting of a civilian on 28 February 1947 triggered an island-wide unrest, which was brutally suppressed with military force in what is now known as the February 28 Incident. Mainstream estimates of casualties range from 18,000 to 30,000, mainly Taiwanese elites. The 28 February Incident has had far-reaching effects on subsequent Taiwanese history.

From 1945 to 1947, under United States mediation, especially through the Marshall Mission, the Nationalists and Communists agreed to start a series of peace talks aiming at establishing a coalition government. The two parties agreed to open multiparty talks on post-World War II political reforms via a Political Consultative Conference. This was included in the Double Tenth Agreement. This agreement was implemented by the Nationalist Government, who organized the first Political Consultative Assembly from 10 to 31 January 1946. Representatives of the Kuomintang, CCP, Chinese Youth Party, and China Democratic League, as well as independent delegates, attended the conference in Chongqing. However, shortly afterward, the two parties failed to reach an agreement and the civil war resumed. In the context of political and military animosity, the National Assembly was summoned by the Nationalists without the participation of the CCP and promulgated the Constitution of the Republic of China. The constitution was criticized by the CCP, and led to the final break between the two sides. The full-scale civil war resumed from early 1947.

After the National Assembly election, the drafted Constitution was adopted by the National Assembly on 25 December 1946, promulgated by the National Government on 1 January 1947, and went into effect on 25 December 1947. The Constitution was seen as the third and final stage of Kuomintang reconstruction of China. Chiang Kai-shek was also elected as the 1st President of the Republic of China under the constitution by the National Assembly in 1948, with Li Zongren being elected as vice-president. The Nationalist Government was abolished on 20 May 1948, after the Government of the Republic of China was established with the presidential inauguration of Chiang. The CCP, though invited to the convention that drafted it, boycotted and declared after the ratification that not only would it not recognize the ROC constitution, but all bills passed by the Nationalist administration would be disregarded as well. Zhou Enlai challenged the legitimacy of the National Assembly in 1947 by accusing the KMT of hand-picking the members of the National Assembly 10 years earlier; claiming they thus could not legitimately represent the Chinese people.

Government 

The National Government governed under a dual-party state apparatus under the ideology of Dang Guo, effectively making it a one-party state; however, existing parties continued to operate and new ones formed. After the end of the Second World War, and particularly after the passage of the constitution in 1946, the National Government was reconstituted to include multiple parties, in preparation for a full democratic government to come.

In February 1928, the Fourth Plenary Session of the 2nd Kuomintang National Congress held in Nanjing passed the Reorganization of the National Government Act. This act stipulated the national government was to be directed and regulated under the Central Executive Committee of the Kuomintang, with the Committee of the National Government being elected by KMT Central Committee. Under the national government was seven ministries – Interior, Foreign Affairs, Finance, Transport, Justice, Agriculture and Mines, and Commerce. There were also additional institutions such as the Supreme Court, Control Yuan, and the General Academy.

With the promulgation of the Organic Law of the National Government in October 1928, the government was reorganized into five different branches or Yuan, namely the Executive Yuan, Legislative Yuan, Judicial Yuan, Examination Yuan as well as the Control Yuan. The Chairman of the National Government was to be the head-of-state and commander-in-chief of the National Revolutionary Army. Chiang Kai-shek was appointed as the first Chairman of the National Government, a position he would retain until 1931. The Organic Law also stipulated that the Kuomintang, through its National Congress and Central Executive Committee, would exercise sovereign power during the period of political tutelage, and the KMT's Political Council would guide and superintend the National Government in the execution of important national affairs and that the council has the power to interpret or amend the organic law.

Military 

Originally organized with Soviet aid as a means for the KMT to unify China against warlordism, the National Revolutionary Army fought major engagements in the Northern Expedition against the Chinese Beiyang Army warlords, in the Second Sino-Japanese War against the Imperial Japanese Army, and in the Chinese Civil War against the People's Liberation Army.

During the Second Sino-Japanese War, the armed forces of the CCP were nominally incorporated into the National Revolutionary Army (while retaining separate commands), but broke away to form the People's Liberation Army shortly after the end of the war. With the promulgation of the Constitution of the Republic of China in 1947 and the formal end of the KMT party-state, the National Revolutionary Army was renamed the Republic of China Armed Forces, with the bulk of its forces forming the Republic of China Army, which retreated to Taiwan in 1949.

Forced conscription campaigns were conducted by the military; they are described by Rudolph Rummel as such:
"Then there was the process of conscription. This was a deadly affair in which men were kidnapped for the army, rounded up indiscriminately by press-gangs or army units among those on the roads or in the towns and villages, or otherwise gathered together. Many men, some the very young and old, were killed resisting or trying to escape. Once collected, they would be roped or chained together and marched, with little food or water, long distances to camp. They often died or were killed along the way, sometimes less than 50 percent reaching camp alive. Then recruit camp was no better, with hospitals resembling Nazi concentration camps like Buchenwald. Probably 3,081,000 died during the Sino-Japanese War; likely another 1,131,000 during the Civil War – 4,212,000 dead in total. Just during conscription."

Economy 

After the Kuomintang reunified the country in 1928, China entered a period of relative prosperity despite civil war and Japanese aggression. In 1937, the Japanese invaded and laid China to waste in eight years of war. The era also saw additional boycott of Japanese products.

Chinese industries continued to develop in the 1930s with the advent of the Nanjing decade in the 1930s when Chiang Kai-shek unified most of the country and brought political stability. China's industries developed and grew from 1927 to 1931. Though badly hit by the Great Depression from 1931 to 1935 and Japan's occupation of Manchuria in 1931, industrial output recovered by 1936. By 1936, industrial output had recovered and surpassed its previous peak in 1931 prior to the Great Depression's effects on China. This is best shown by the trends in Chinese GDP. In 1932, China's GDP peaked at US$28.8 billion, before falling to $21.3 billion by 1934 and recovering to $23.7 billion by 1935. By 1930, foreign investment in China totaled $3.5 billion, with Japan leading ($1.4 billion) and the United Kingdom at 1 billion. By 1948, however, the capital stock had halted with investment dropping to only $3 billion, with the US and Britain leading.

However, the rural economy was hit hard by the Great Depression of the 1930s, in which an overproduction of agricultural goods lead to massive falling prices for China as well as an increase in foreign imports (as agricultural goods produced in western countries were "dumped" in China). In 1931, imports of rice in China amounted to 21 million bushels compared with 12 million in 1928. Other goods saw even more staggering increases. In 1932, 15 million bushels of grain were imported compared with 900,000 in 1928. This increased competition leads to a massive decline in Chinese agricultural prices (which were cheaper) and thus the income of rural farmers. In 1932, agricultural prices were 41 percent of 1921 levels. Rural incomes had fallen to 57 percent of 1931 levels by 1934 in some areas. Under this peculiar context for rural China, the Chinese Rural Reconstruction Movement was implemented by some social activists who graduated as professors of the United States with tangible but limited progress in modernizing the tax, infrastructural, economical, cultural, and educational equipment and mechanisms of rural regions. The social activists actively coordinated with the local governments in towns and villages since the early 1930s. However, this policy was subsequently neglected and canceled by the Nationalist government due to rampant wars and the lack of resources following the Second Sino-Japanese War and the Second Chinese Civil War.

In 1937, Japan invaded China and the resulting warfare laid waste to China. Most of the prosperous east China coast was occupied by the Japanese, who carried out various atrocities such as the Rape of Nanjing in 1937 and random massacres of whole villages. In one anti-guerrilla sweep in 1942, the Japanese killed up to 200,000 civilians in a month. The war was estimated to have killed between 20 and 25 million Chinese and destroyed all that Chiang had built up in the preceding decade. Development of industries was severely hampered after the war by devastating conflict as well as the inflow of cheap American goods. By 1946, Chinese industries operated at 20 percent capacity and had 25 percent of the output of pre-war China.

One effect of the war was a massive increase in government control of industries. In 1936, government-owned industries were only 15% of GDP. However, the ROC government took control of many industries in order to fight the war. In 1938, the ROC established a commission for industries and mines to control and supervise firms, as well as instilling price controls. By 1942, 70 percent of the capital of Chinese industry was owned by the government.

Following the war with Japan, Chiang acquired Taiwan from Japan and renewed his struggle with the Communists. However, the corruption of the KMT, as well as hyperinflation as a result of trying to fight the civil war, resulted in mass unrest throughout the Republic and sympathy for the communists. In addition, the Communists' promise to redistribute land gained them support among the massive rural population. In 1949, the People's Liberation captured Beijing and later Nanjing as well. The People's Republic of China was proclaimed in Beijing on 1 October 1949. The Republic of China central government relocated to Taipei on 7 December 1949, to Taiwan where Japan had laid an educational groundwork.

Former sites 
Almost all of the former sites of the nationalist government are headquartered in the city of Nanking, the capital at the time, with only one exception.

When the city of Nanking was not captured by the Nationalist Government, they chose the following buildings as their headquarters.

See also 

 Government of the Republic of China
 Kuomintang
 Republic of China (1912–1949)
 Beiyang government (1912–1928)
 Communist-controlled China (1927–1949)
 Tibet (1912–1951)
 Mongolian People's Republic
 Sino-German cooperation (1926–1941)
 Diplomatic history of World War II
 Nanjing Decade

Notes

References

Citations

Sources 

 Bergere, Marie-Claire. Sun Yat-Sen (1998), 480 pages, the standard biography
 Boorman, Howard L., et al., ed. Biographical Dictionary of Republican China. (Vol. I-IV and Index. 1967–1979). 600 short scholarly biographies excerpt and text search. Also online at Internet Archive.
 Boorman, Howard L. "Sun Yat-sen" in Boorman, ed. Biographical Dictionary of Republican China (1970) 3: 170–89, complete text online
 Dreyer, Edward L. China at War, 1901–1949. (1995). 422 pp.
 Eastman Lloyd. Seeds of Destruction: Nationalist China in War and Revolution, 1937– 1945. (1984)
 Eastman Lloyd et al. The Nationalist Era in China, 1927–1949 (1991)
 Fairbank, John K., ed. The Cambridge History of China, Vol. 12, Republican China 1912–1949. Part 1. (1983). 1001 pp.
 Fairbank, John K. and Feuerwerker, Albert, eds. The Cambridge History of China. Vol. 13: Republican China, 1912–1949, Part 2. (1986). 1092 pp.
 Fogel, Joshua A. The Nanjing Massacre in History and Historiography (2000)
 Gordon, David M. "The China-Japan War, 1931–1945," The Journal of Military History v70#1 (2006) 137–182; major historiographical overview of all important books and interpretations; online
 Hsiung, James C. and Steven I. Levine, eds. China's Bitter Victory: The War with Japan, 1937–1945 (1992), essays by scholars 
 Hsi-sheng, Ch'i. Nationalist China at War: Military Defeats and Political Collapse, 1937–1945 (1982)
 Hung, Chang-tai. War and Popular Culture: Resistance in Modern China, 1937–1945 (1994) complete text online free
 Lara, Diana. The Chinese People at War: Human Suffering and Social Transformation, 1937–1945 (2010)
 Rubinstein, Murray A., ed. Taiwan: A New History (2006), 560pp
 Shiroyama, Tomoko. China during the Great Depression: Market, State, and the World Economy, 1929–1937 (2008)
 Shuyun, Sun. The Long March: The True History of Communist China's Founding Myth (2007)
 Taylor, Jay. The Generalissimo: Chiang Kai-shek and the Struggle for Modern China. (2009) 
 Westad, Odd Arne. Decisive Encounters: The Chinese Civil War, 1946–1950. (2003). 413 pages.

External links 
 

Politics of the Republic of China (1912–1949)
Government of the Republic of China
1927 establishments in China
1948 disestablishments in China
1920s in China
1930s in China
1940s in China
Second Sino-Japanese War